Amanda Cartier (born November 14, 1977, in Houston, Texas) is an American female race car driver with residence in San Francisco, California, United States. She currently competes in both the Formula Pro USA Western Championships. and Formula 4 United States Championship series.

Racing career 
Cartier began her racing career in 2014 by spending two years racing Rotax 125 TAG karts in the Simraceway Arrive and Drive Series with 2nd overall place in the championship in 2015. She then furthered her training by completing the Simraceway Formula 3 School of Racing program located at Sonoma Raceway.

Her F4 racing career started in 2019 when she made her professional racing debut running a half-season in the SCCA Pro Racing sanctioned Formula Pro USA Western Championships with the World Speed Motorsports team. She would go on to win two F4 Masters Class trophies at Sonoma Raceway, ending the season as F4 Masters Vice-Champion and an overall 6th place in the season points championship.

Currently, she had joined in the F4 U.S. Championship support race during the 2019 Formula 1 US Grand Prix at the Circuit of the Americas with two other women. She has announced to continue with Formula Pro USA Championships in 2020.

Racing record

FPUSA F4 Series Results 
(key) (Races in bold indicate class win) (Races in italics indicate pole position)

USF4 Series Results 
(key) (Races in bold indicate class win) (Races in italics indicate pole position)

References

External links 

 Profile at Driver Database
 Website

American female racing drivers
Racing drivers from Houston
Racing drivers from Texas
1977 births
Living people
21st-century American women
United States F4 Championship drivers